Intel Fortran Compiler, as part of Intel OneAPI HPC toolkit, is a group of Fortran compilers from Intel for Windows, macOS, and Linux.

Overview
The compilers generate code for IA-32 and Intel 64 processors and certain non-Intel but compatible processors, such as certain AMD processors. A specific release of the compiler (11.1) remains available for development of Linux-based applications for IA-64 (Itanium 2) processors. On Windows, it is known as Intel Visual Fortran. On macOS and Linux, it is known as Intel Fortran. In 2020 the existing compiler was renamed “Intel Fortran Compiler Classic” (ifort) and a new Intel Fortran Compiler for oneAPI (ifx) supporting GPU offload was introduced.

The 2021 release of the Classic compiler adds full Fortran support through the 2018 standard, full OpenMP* 4.5, and Initial Open MP 5.1 for CPU only. The 2021 beta compiler focuses on OpenMP for GPU Offload. When used with the Intel OneAPI HPC toolkit (see the "Description of Packaging" below) the compiler can also automatically generate Message Passing Interface calls for distributed memory multiprocessing from OpenMP directives.

For more information on Fortran standards, a number or resources are available, such as the Wikipedia Fortran entry or the Fortran wiki page.

Optimizations
Intel compilers are optimized for computer systems using processors that support Intel architectures. They are designed to minimize stalls and to produce code that executes in the fewest possible number of cycles. Intel Fortran Compilers support three separate high-level techniques for optimizing the compiled program: interprocedural optimization (IPO), profile-guided optimization (PGO), and other high-level optimizations (HLO).

Interprocedural optimization applies typical compiler optimizations (such as constant propagation) but uses a broader scope that may include multiple procedures, multiple files, or the entire program.

Regarding profile-guided optimization, the compiler generates a dataset of performance-related information from using the application with representative workloads, which it then analyzes to find which parts of the application are executed more and less frequently. The compiler uses these data to organize application execution to optimize performance based on how the application is actually used. This is in contrast to IPO which optimizes applications according to the logical flow of the application independent of workloads. The two can be combined to provide workload-based optimizations within which the logical-flow is optimized. Thus, all optimizations can benefit from profile-guided feedback because they are less reliant on heuristics when making compilation decisions.

High-level optimizations are optimizations performed on a version of the program that more closely represents the source code. This includes loop interchange, loop fusion, loop unrolling, loop distribution, data prefetch, and more.

Standards support
The Intel Fortran Compiler Classic fully supports Fortran through the 2018 standard. The Intel Fortran Compiler (Beta) supports full Fortran 77/90/95 and has partial support of the Fortran 2003 standard.

Architectures
 IA-32
 x86-64 (Intel 64 and AMD64)
 Intel Xeon Phi coprocessor
 IA-64 (Itanium 2)
Xe architecture

Description of packaging
The compilers are available standalone from Intel and from APT and Yum repositories. They are also available in the Intel oneAPI HPC Toolkit which includes other build tools, such as libraries, and analysis tools for error checking and performance analysis. Containers with the compilers are on Docker Hub.

History since 2003

Debugging
The Intel compiler provides debugging information that is standard for the common debuggers (DWARF 2 on Linux, similar to gdb, and COFF for Windows). Debugging is done on Windows using the Visual Studio debugger, and on Linux using gdb.

While the Intel compiler can generate a gprof-compatible profiling output, Intel also provides a kernel-level, system-wide statistical profiler as a separate product called VTune. VTune features an easy-to-use GUI (integrated into Visual Studio for Windows, Eclipse for Linux) as well as a command-line interface. In addition to the VTune profiler, there is Intel Advisor that specializes in vectorization optimization and tools for threading design and prototyping.

Intel also offers a tool for memory and threading error detection called Intel Inspector XE. Regarding memory errors, it helps detect memory leaks, memory corruption, allocation/de-allocation of API mismatches and inconsistent memory API usage. Regarding threading errors, it helps detect data races (both heap and stack), deadlocks and thread and synch API errors.

See also
 Intel Integrated Performance Primitives (IPP)
 oneAPI Data Analytics Library (oneDAL)
 Intel oneAPI Math Kernel Library (oneMKL)
 oneAPI Threading Building Blocks (oneTBB)
 VTune Profiler
 Intel C++ Compiler
 Intel Developer Zone (Intel DZ; support and discussion)
 Intel Parallel Studio XE

References

External links
 

Fortran compilers
Fortran compiler